On 28 July 2022, Lilia Valutyte, a nine-year-old English girl, was stabbed in Boston, Lincolnshire, England outside an embroidery shop. She was later pronounced dead at Boston Pilgrim Hospital. Before the attack it is understood that Valutyte was playing with hula hoops with her younger sister. Deividas Skebas, a Lithuanian national, has been charged with her murder.

Background 
Lilia Valutyte was born on 2 February 2013 at Boston Pilgrim Hospital and lived in Boston. Valutyte also had a younger sister. She studied at Boston Pioneers Academy and was a pupil at Carlton Road Primary School prior to her death.

Killing 
On 28 July 2022, nine-year-old Lilia Valutyte was playing with hula hoops outside an embroidery shop on Fountains Lane, Boston with her younger sister before she was stabbed. A man was seen on CCTV walking down Wormgate and Fountains Lane five minutes before the attack took place. Valutyte's mother was just yards away when the attack took place and heard someone screaming "mom." She went outside to find her youngest daughter standing just metres away from her big sister who was bleeding to death. Valutyte was taken to Boston Pilgrim Hospital where she later died.

Investigation & legal proceedings 
On 30 July 2022, a 22-year-old man was arrested on suspicion of the murder of Lilia Valutyte. Two other people were also arrested but were released with no further action. On the evening of 31 July 2022, 22-year-old Deividas Skebas was charged with the murder. On 1 August 2022, Skebas appeared at Lincoln Crown Court, he did not enter a plea and was remanded into custody. In August 2022, Skebas was attacked by prisoners at HM Prison Wakefield, West Yorkshire with a prison shank and was airlifted to hospital.

Skebas was due to appear at Lincoln Crown Court for another hearing on 19 September 2022, however on 23 September 2022 this was adjourned to allow reports to be carried out, Skebas did not enter a plea. Another hearing took place at the same court on 9 December 2022, and again, Skebas did not enter a plea and the case was adjourned to allow additional medical assessments to be carried out. An additional hearing for Skebas was held on 19 January 2023. Skebas did not attend the hearing. The case was again adjourned. On 22 February 2023, a hearing took place at Lincoln Crown Court in Skebas's abscence. The case was again adjourned until 28 February 2023 when a hearing was meant to take place in front of a High Court judge. Skebas was also due to stand trial on this day. However, Judge Simon Hurst vacated the hearing until 17 April 2023.

Reactions 
Priti Patel, the then Home Secretary tweeted that she was "appalled" by the killing.

Matt Warman, the then MP for Boston and Skegness tweeted: "it is vital that those responsible are brought to justice."

On 2 September 2022, Lilia Valutyte's funeral was held at St Botolph's Church, Boston. Her coffin was carried by a white horse-drawn carriage. Her small white coffin was covered in butterflies and was carried by pallbearers wearing pink ties. Flowers and other tributes were also left in memory of Lilia.

References 

July 2022 events in the United Kingdom
Deaths by person in England
2020s in Lincolnshire
Stabbing attacks in England
Stabbing attacks in 2022
Violence against children in England